A number of ships have been named SuperStar Gemini, including -
 - a cruise liner launched in 1991 as Crown Jewel she carried the name SuperStar Gemini between 1995 and 2009
 - a cruise liner launched in 1992 as Dreamward, renamed Norwegian Dream in 1998 and SuperStar Gemini in 2012

Ship names